Hans Oskar "Kihlen" Linnros (born August 15, 1983 in Sundbyberg, Sweden) is a Swedish musician. He was part of the alternative hip hop band Snook alongside Daniel Adams-Ray, before going solo and releasing his solo studio debut album Vilja bli that reached number 2 on the Swedish Albums Chart. The track "Från och med Du" from the album reached the top of Sverigetopplistan, the official Swedish Singles Chart.

Oskar Linnros has also produced a number of other artists including acts Petter, Fibes, Oh Fibes! and Veronica Maggio.

Biography

Snook

Linnros started out as a rapper in the alternative hip hop duo Snook together with Daniel Adams-Ray. Snook released two albums:	Vi vet inte vart vi ska men vi ska komma dit in 2004 and Är in 2006 receiving both praise and heavy criticism. The bands unorthodox hip hop was met by comments that the band wasn’t keeping it real and the fact that Adams-Ray spent his teenage years in Lidingö caused critics to label them “Upper class rappers”. Despite some critics, the band had many hits, received awards from radio station P3, The 2003 Swedish Hip-hop Awards 2003, and best Swedish band at the MTV Europe Music Awards 2006.

Post Snook
Snook drifted apart. Daniel Adams-Ray attended design school Berghs School of Communication  Linnros started producing other artists such as rapper Petter, soft rockers Fibes, Oh Fibes! and singer Veronica Maggio. The album Linnros produced and wrote for Maggio, Och vinnaren är... was nominated for five Swedish Grammies.  The two had met while working on a remix for Petter and became romantically involved.  He also started Baile funk and electro influenced rap group Maskinen. The group is still around but Linnros left. He explained to newspaper Dagens Nyheter that it was just a fun project with friends and he was tired of " fastfood music".

Solo

In June 2010, Oskar Linnros released Vilja bli, an album he had written, played and produced. The album contained hardly any rap vocals and was quickly compared to Swedish artists such as Mauro Scocco, Orup and Peter LeMarc, artists that were extremely popular in Scandinavia in the late 1980s and early 1990s. Linnros admitted that he wanted to bring back an updated version of that sound. He also named Donny Hathaway and Al Green as influences. The album received very good reviews  and influential music journalist Jan Gradvall wrote that the album "is one of the most complete Swedish debut album I have heard and full of hits". Oskar was nominated for a Swedish Grammies 2018 in "Best Pop" for the album "Väntar på en Ängel".

Discography

Albums

Extended plays

Singles

References

External links 

Living people
1983 births
Swedish hip hop musicians
Swedish pop singers
Swedish soul singers
Swedish songwriters
Swedish-language singers
21st-century Swedish singers
Musicians from Stockholm
Singers from Stockholm
21st-century Swedish male singers